Nihari is a stew originating in Lucknow, the capital of 18th-century Awadh under the Mughal Empire in the Indian subcontinent. It consists of slow-cooked meat, mainly a shank cut of beef, lamb and mutton, or goat meat, as well as chicken and bone marrow. It is flavoured with long pepper, a relative of black pepper.

Etymology 
The name  originates from Arabic , meaning "morning"; it was originally eaten by nawabs in the Mughal Empire as a breakfast course following Fajr prayer.

History
According to many sources, nihari originated in the royal kitchens of Lucknow, Awadh (modern-day Uttar Pradesh, India), in the late 18th century, during the last throes of the Mughal Empire. It was originally meant to be consumed as a heavy, high-energy breakfast dish on an empty stomach by working-class citizens, particularly in colder climates and seasons. However, the dish later gained a significant amount of popularity and eventually became a staple of the royal cuisine of Mughal-era nawabs.

Nihari developed with the overall cuisine of the Muslims of the Indian subcontinent. It remains a popular delicacy, especially in parts of Old Delhi, Lucknow, Dhaka, and Chittagong. The dish is known for its spiciness, taste, texture, and gravy.

Popularity
Nihari is a traditional dish among the Indian Muslim communities of Lucknow, Delhi, and Bhopal. Following the partition of India in 1947, many Urdu-speaking Muslims from northern India migrated to Karachi in West Pakistan and Dhaka in East Pakistan, and established a number of restaurants serving the dish. In Karachi, nihari became a large-scale success and soon spread in prominence and availability across Pakistan.

Some nihari outlets in Old Delhi claim to have kept an unbroken cycle of  going for more than a century.

Medicinal remedies
Nihari is also used as a home remedy for fever, rhinorrhea, and the common cold.

See also

Cuisine of the Indian subcontinent
List of stews

References

South Asian curries
National dishes
Muhajir cuisine
Indian cuisine
Indian meat dishes
Indian soups and stews
Telangana cuisine
Hyderabadi cuisine
Mughlai cuisine
Bangladeshi meat dishes
Bangladeshi soups and stews
Pakistani soups and stews
Pakistani meat dishes
Lahori cuisine